Sally Bishop is a 1932 British romantic drama film directed by T. Hayes Hunter and starring Joan Barry, Harold Huth and Isabel Jeans. It is an adaptation of the 1910 novel Sally Bishop, a Romance by E. Temple Thurston. The novel had previously been adapted into two silent films.

It was made at Beaconsfield Studios.

Cast
 Joan Barry as Sally Bishop 
 Harold Huth as John Traill 
 Isabel Jeans as Dolly Durlacher 
 Benita Hume as Evelyn Standish 
 Kay Hammond as Janet Hallard 
 Emlyn Williams as Arthur Montague 
 Anthony Bushell as Bart 
 Annie Esmond as Landlady 
 Diana Churchill as Typist

References

Bibliography
 Low, Rachael. Filmmaking in 1930s Britain. George Allen & Unwin, 1985.
 Wood, Linda. British Films, 1927-1939. British Film Institute, 1986.

External links

1932 films
British romantic drama films
1932 romantic drama films
Films directed by T. Hayes Hunter
Films set in England
British Lion Films films
Films shot at Beaconsfield Studios
Films based on British novels
British black-and-white films
1930s English-language films
1930s British films